The Focke-Wulf Ta 153 (GH+KV) was a prototype German fighter aircraft built during World War II. It was a development of the Fw 190C, a Fw 190A with a DB 603A engine.

A project called Ra-4 was initiated in 1943. The idea was to create a new fighter derived from the Fw 190 for higher altitudes. In that sense it was a competitor for the Messerschmitt Me 155B project. The Ta 153A-1 would get the Jumo 213A or C engine and the new wings of the Fw 190B prototype. There was also the Ta 153D-1, a high-altitude version with long-span, high-aspect ratio wings and the DB 603G engine.

Although derived from the Fw 190, the Ta 153 was essentially a new aircraft. This would have required a complete conversion of the production lines with new jigs and tooling. For that reason Kurt Tank decided to modify the existing Fw 190A by adding a rear fuselage 'plug', thereby creating the Fw 190D. Later this fuselage was mated with the long wings of the Ta 153D-1 for the successful Ta 152H.

Specifications (Ta 153)

References

See also

Ta 153
Abandoned military aircraft projects of Germany
Single-engined tractor aircraft
Low-wing aircraft
Ta 153